Zahidullah Salmi, also known as Zahid, (born 3 April 2002) is an Afghan cricketer. He made his first-class debut for Speen Ghar Region in the 2017–18 Ahmad Shah Abdali 4-day Tournament on 29 April 2018.

References

External links
 

2002 births
Living people
Afghan cricketers
Spin Ghar Tigers cricketers
Place of birth missing (living people)